Andronic is a surname. Notable people with the surname include:

Oleg Andronic, Moldovan footballer
Valeriu Andronic, Moldovan footballer
Gheorghe Andronic, Moldovan footballer
Dorian Andronic, Romanian footballer
Igor Andronic, Moldovan footballer
 

Romanian-language surnames